Eddy Allen Maillet (born October 19, 1967) is a Seychellois football referee, born in Victoria. He has been a full international referee for FIFA since 2001.

He was selected as a referee for the 2004 African Cup of Nations in Tunisia, the 2006 African Cup of Nations in Egypt, 2007 AFC Asian Cup, the 2008 African Cup of Nations in Ghana, the 2009 FIFA Confederations Cup in South Africa and for the 2010 FIFA World Cup. His first game as referee in the 2010 World Cup was in the Honduras v Chile opening round match on 16 June 2010.

External links
 FIFA Profile

References

Seychellois football referees
1967 births
Living people
2010 FIFA World Cup referees
FIFA World Cup referees
People from Greater Victoria, Seychelles
AFC Asian Cup referees